Thomas Noel Mitchell is an Irish academic and university administrator who served as 42nd provost (president) of Trinity College Dublin from 1991 to 2001.

Biography
Mitchell, a native of Mayo, Ireland, was born in Castlebar on 7 December 1939 to Patrick Mitchell and Margaret Mitchell. He graduated with first class honours with a B.A. and M.A. in Latin and Greek from University College Galway. He earned a doctorate from Cornell University and a Litt.D. from Trinity College Dublin. He started his academic career as instructor at Cornell University from 1965 to 1966. He joined the faculty of Swarthmore College in 1966, first as assistant professor (1966-1973), then associate professor (1973-1978), and full professor (1978-1979). He returned to the Republic of Ireland as Professor of Latin at Trinity College Dublin in 1979. His work on Cicero and Roman Republicanism has won him wide acclaim and has been described as a monument in the field.

He served as Director of Hibernia College in Dublin, and was the former Chairman of the boards of St. James’s Hospital and the Ireland National Children's Trust. He was on the Irish Council for Science, Engineering and Technology. He also served as Director of the Trinity Foundation. In 1991, he was the first catholic elected as Provost of Trinity College Dublin, since Micheál Ó Mordha (Michael Moore) provost from 1689-1690.

He is a member of the Royal Irish Academy and the American Philosophical Society, and is a Fellow of Oriel College, Oxford and St. John's College, Cambridge. He holds honorary doctorates from numerous universities, including the Queen's University, Belfast, National University of Ireland, Swarthmore College, Charles University in Prague, the State University of New York, and Victoria University, Melbourne.

References

External links

1939 births
Living people
Alumni of the University of Galway
Alumni of Trinity College Dublin
Cornell University alumni
Fellows of Trinity College Dublin
Members of the Royal Irish Academy
Provosts of Trinity College Dublin
Swarthmore College faculty
Members of the American Philosophical Society